Philip Testerman (born January 12, 1927) was an American politician in the state of South Dakota. He was a member of the South Dakota State Senate and South Dakota House of Representatives. He was Assistant Minority Leader of the Senate from 1979 to 1980. Holding a high school education, he was a farmer and insurance agent.

References

Possibly living people
South Dakota Democrats
1927 births